The Rustamid dynasty (or Rustumids, Rostemids) was a ruling house of Ibāḍī imāms of Persian descent centered in present-day Algeria. The dynasty governed as a Muslim theocracy for a century and a half from its capital Tahert (present day Tagdemt) until the Ismaili Fatimid Caliphate defeated it. Rustamid authority extended over what is now central and western Algeria, parts of southern Tunisia, and the Jebel Nafusa and Fezzan regions in Libya as far as Zawila.

History

The Ibāḍī movement reached North Africa by 719, when the missionary Salma ibn Sa'd was sent from the Ibādī jama'a of Basra to Kairouan. By 740, their efforts had converted the major Berber tribes of Huwara around Tripoli, in the Nafusa Mountains and at Zenata in western Tripolitania. In 757 (140 AH), a group of four Basra-educated missionaries including ʻAbd ar-Rahmān ibn Rustam proclaimed an Ibāḍī imamate in Tripolitania, starting an abortive state led by Abu l-Khattab Abdul-A'la ibn as-Samh which lasted until the Abbasid Caliphate dispatched Muhammad ibn al-Ash'ath al-Khuza'i to suppress it in 761, and Abul-Khattab Abdul-A'la ibn as-Samh was killed. On his death, the Tripolitanian Ibādiyya elected Abu l-Hatim al-Malzuzi as Imām; he was killed in 772 after launching a second unsuccessful revolt in 768. After this, the center of power shifted to Algeria, and, in 777, ʻAbd ar-Rahmān ibn Rustam, an Ifriqiyan-born convert to the Ibāḍī movement of Persian origin and one of the four founders of the imamate, was elected Imām; after this, the post remained in his family, a practice which the Ibādiyya justified by noting that he came from no tribe, and thus his election as imam would not favour the domination of one Ibadi tribe over the others.

The new imamate was centered on the newly built capital of Tahert (or Tahart), near present-day Tiaret. Several Ibādī tribes displaced from Tunisia and Tripolitania settled there and strong fortifications were built. It became a major stop on the newly developing trade routes with sub-Saharan Africa and the Middle East.

Ibn as-Saghir also describes the Imām as ascetic, repairing his own house and refusing gifts; the citizens sharply criticized him if they considered him derelict in his duty. Religious ethics were strictly enforced by law.

The Rustamids fought the Kairouan-based Aghlabids of Ifriqiya in 812, but otherwise reached a modus vivendi; this displeased Ibādī tribes on the Aghlabid border, who launched a few rebellions.

After Abdu l-Wahhāb, the Rustamids grew militarily weak; they were easily conquered by the Ismaili Fatimids in 909, upon which many Ibāḍis – including the last Imām – fled to the Sedrata tribe of Ouargla, whence they would ultimately emigrate to Mzab.

Society and culture 
The Rustamid dynasty, "developed a cosmopolitan reputation in which Christians, non-Kharijite Muslims, and adherents of different sects of Kharijism lived".
On the intellectual field, the Rustamids had many scholars and learned men, such as ‘Abd ar-Rahman ibn Rustam, ‘Abd al-Wahhab ibn ‘Abd ar-Rahman, Aflah ibn ‘Abd al-Wahhab, dan Abu al-Yaqzhan ibn Aflah, Mahdi an-Nafusi, ‘Abd Allah al-Lamthi, and Mahmud ibn Bakr. ‘Abd ar-Rahman had an exegesis of the Qur’an. ‘Abd al-Wahhab wrote his Masa'il Nafusah on Islamic jurisprudence. Aflah mastered Arabic literature, mathematics, and astronomy. Abu al-Yaqzhan wrote about 40 works. Because of their intellectual enthusiasm, the Rustamids vigorously transferred valuable works from the Mashriq to the Maghrib, especially to the library of al-Ma‘shumah (in Tahert) and that of Khizanah Nafusah (in Jabal Nafusah). Moreover, Tahert was famous as ‘Iraq al-Maghrib, al-‘Iraq ash-Shaghir, Balkh al-Maghrib, or Little Basra.
Apart from these achievements, the Rustamids also had significant contribution to Islamization in the Maghrib and Bilad as-Sudan. For about two centuries (130-340 AH / 750-950 AD), the Kharijite people gained control of trade routes in the Maghrib and Bilad as-Sudan. Many Ibadite merchants made journeys along the vast area, such as Tahert, Wargla, Nafzawa, Jabal Nafusah, Tadmakkat, Gao, and Ghana. By this economic activity, the Ibadites took advantages of trading business and preaching Islam at the same time.

Rustamid Imams

Abd al-Rahman ibn Rustam (Bānū-Bādūsyān) (776-788)
Abd al-Wahhab ibn Abd al-Rahman (788-824)
 Aflah ibn ʿAbdi l-Wahhab (824-872)
 Abu Bakr ibn Aflah (872-874)
 Muhammad Abu l-Yaqzan ibn Aflah (874-894)
 Yusuf Abu Hatim ibn Muhammad Abi l-Yaqzan (894-895) 
 Yaʿqub ibn Aflah (895-899)
 Yusuf Abu Hatim ibn Muhammad Abi l-Yaqzan, again (899-906)
 Yaqzan ibn Muhammad Abi l-Yaqzan (906-909)

References

Sources 
 
 
 Wheatley, Paul, "The Places where Men Pray Together: Cities in Islamic Lands, Seventh Through the Tenth Centuries", Published by University of Chicago Press, 2001, .
 The Encyclopedia of World History
 Card of Rustamid or Tahert Kingdom.
 Rustamid Dynasty Encyclopedy Britanica.
 

Medieval Algeria
Former countries in Africa
Algerian people of Iranian descent
Iranian Muslim dynasties
Lists of office-holders
777 establishments
States and territories established in the 770s
States and territories disestablished in the 900s
909 disestablishments
8th-century establishments in Africa
10th-century disestablishments in Africa
Kharijites
Former kingdoms
Former theocracies